Andrea Brognara (born 26 May 1971) is an Italian cyclist, who competed as a professional from 1996 to 2003.

Major results
2001
 7th Giro di Campania
2002
 5th Trofeo Città di Castelfidardo

Grand Tour general classification results timeline

References

External links 

1971 births
Living people
Cyclists from the Province of Verona
Italian male cyclists